Rabbi Yoav Ben-Tzur (born 11 June 1958) is an Israeli politician who currently serves as a member of the Knesset for Shas, Minister in the Ministry of Labor, and as acting Minister of Health. Ben-Tzur previously served as the Deputy Minister of the Interior.

Biography
Born in Kfar Saba, Ben-Tzur attended school in Netanya, and the Or Yisrael yeshiva in Petah Tikva. During his military service in the IDF, he served in the Soldier Teachers unit. He later became a reserve captain in the Nahal Brigade. Between 1985 and 1992, he worked at the Or Hadash middle boarding school. In 1993, he became Immigration Co-Ordinator in the Northern District for the Ministry of Religious Affairs. The following year, he took up the position of Deputy Director General of the National Centre for the Development of Holy Places, where he worked between 1994 and 1997. He then became CEO of HaMeshakem in 1998, serving until 2008. In 2001, he became chairman of the Jerusalem Religious Council, a position he held until the following year. He later worked as director-general of Shas' Ma'ayan HaChinuch HaTorani school system from 2007 until 2013.

A member of Shas, Ben-Tzur was placed twelfth on the Shas list for the 2013 Knesset elections, but failed to win a seat, as Shas won eleven seats. However, he entered the Knesset on 22 June 2014 as a replacement for Ariel Atias, who resigned in order to take a break from politics. He was re-elected in 2015, April 2019, 2019 and 2020. In May 2020 he was appointed Deputy Minister of the Development of the Periphery, Negev, and Galilee and Deputy Minister of the Interior. He subsequently resigned from the Knesset and was replaced by Yosef Taieb. He was re-elected to the Knesset in the March 2021 elections.

Ben-Tzur has a master's degree in Business and Public Administration from the University of Manchester. He is married with seven children, and lives in Jerusalem.

References

External links

1958 births
Living people
Alumni of the University of Manchester
Deputy ministers of Israel
Israeli chief executives
Israeli educational theorists
Israeli Orthodox rabbis
Jewish Israeli politicians
Members of the 19th Knesset (2013–2015)
Members of the 20th Knesset (2015–2019)
Members of the 21st Knesset (2019)
Members of the 22nd Knesset (2019–2020)
Members of the 23rd Knesset (2020–2021)
Members of the 24th Knesset (2021–2022)
Members of the 25th Knesset (2022–)
People from Kfar Saba
Rabbinic members of the Knesset
Shas politicians